is a Japanese professional boxer.

Professional boxing career

Early career
Kobayashi made his professional boxing debut against the 2020 West Japan "Rookie of the Year" Hyogo Kimura on 6 June 2021, at the Amagasaki Cultural Center in Amagasaki, Japan. He won the fight by a sixth-round technical knockout. Kobayashi was expected to face the once-defeated Hayato Aoki on 11 September 2021. The bout was later postponed until 6 November 2021. He won the fight by unanimous decision, with two scorecards of 60–54 and one scorecard of 59–55.

Kobayashi faced Sora Takeda on 6 March 2022. He made quick work of his opponent, as he stopped him at the 2:38 minute mark of the opening round. Kobayashi next faced the more experienced Cris Ganoza on 25 September 2022. He won the fight by a second-round knockout.

WBO AP mini-flyweight champion
His four-fight win streak earned Kobayashi the chance to face the #6 ranked WBC mini flyweight contender Marco John Rementizo for the vacant WBO Asia Pacific title. The title bout was booked as the co-main event of "REAL SPIRITS VOL.84", which took place on 4 December 2022 at the Osaka Prefectural Gymnasium in Osaka, Japan. He captured the vacant belt by unanimous decision, with scores of 97–92, 97–92 nad 98–91.

Professional boxing record

References

Living people
1998 births
Japanese male boxers
Sportspeople from Hyōgo Prefecture
Mini-flyweight boxers
Flyweight boxers